The Hamilton Astronomical Society Observatory is located next to the Hamilton Zoo in Brymer Road to the west of Hamilton City, New Zealand. The Hamilton Astronomical Society was founded on the 3rd of July, 1933 and is one of New Zealand's oldest astronomical societies.

The observatory instruments include two radio telescopes (32'/10m and 26'/8m diameter), and a range of optical instruments, including one 24" Classical cassegrain telescope, a 14" and 8" Schmidt-Cassegrain telescope, and one 12" Dobsonian telescope.

The observatory is open to the public on the first and third Wednesdays of every month at 7:30pm (8:30pm during daylight saving).

History 
The Hamilton Astronomical Society's first dedicated meeting house was the observatory, built at the Hamilton Zoo site in 1984. The observing dome for the 24" Classical Cassegrain telescope was completed in 1997, and opened by Sir Patrick Moore.

References

External links
Hamilton Astronomical Society web pages

Astronomical observatories in New Zealand